Bismarck–Mandan, colloquially referred to as BisMan, is the metropolitan area composed of Burleigh, Morton, and Oliver counties in the state of North Dakota.

Its core cities, Bismarck and Mandan, are located on opposite sides of the upper Missouri River. Lincoln is a suburb located immediately south-east of Bismarck. The 2019 population of the MSA was estimated at 128,949. The area grew considerably with the addition of Oliver and Sioux counties in 2013. However, with relatively sparse populations, the addition of Oliver and Sioux counties only added approximately 6,300 people to the metropolitan population, many of whom were later excluded when Sioux county was removed in 2018. The 2018 Bismarck–Mandan–Lincoln urban population is estimated at 99,410.

Counties
In 2013, the Office of Management and Budget revised the definitions of metropolitan statistical areas; the Bismarck–Mandan MSA was enlarged by the inclusion of Oliver and Sioux counties from that year. In 2018, the same office removed Sioux county from the MSA.

 Burleigh County (95,626)
 Morton County (31,364)
 Oliver County (1,959)

Core cities
Bismarck (73,112)
Mandan (22,519)

Other cities and towns

Almont
Baldwin
Breien
Center
Driscoll
Fallon
Flasher
Fort Rice
Glen Ullin
Hannover
Harmon
Hebron
Hensler
Huff
Lincoln
McKenzie
Menoken
Moffit
New Salem
Regan
Saint Anthony
Sanger
Sims
Sterling
Wilton
Wing

Demographics
As of the census of 2000, there were 100,828 people, 45,751 households, and 29,620 families residing within the MSA. The racial makeup of the MSA was 95.24% White, 0.23% African American, 3.04% Native American, 0.37% Asian, 0.02% Pacific Islander, 0.16% from other races, and 0.93% from two or more races. Hispanic or Latino of any race were 0.67% of the population.

The median income for a household in the MSA was $39,169, and the median income for a family was $48,339. Males had a median income of $32,726 versus $21,364 for females. The per capita income for the MSA was $18,819.

See also
North Dakota statistical areas

References